No 73, Shanthi Nivasa is a 2007 Indian Kannada-language musical drama film directed by Sudeep, starring him, Anu Prabhakar, Deepa. The film background score and soundtrack were composed by Bharadwaj and Produced by Kiccha Creations. The film released on 15 June 2007. This film is remake of 1972 Hindi film Bawarchi which itself was a remake of 1966 Bengali film Galpo Holeo Satti which was already remade in Kannada earlier as Sakala Kala Vallabha.

Synopsis
Shanthi Nivasa, commonly known as no.73 Shanthi Nivasa, is a large house with a number of selfish, quarrelsome, and peculiar residents, with the exception of Radha. The situation is so bad that one servant barely remains for a month. When Raghu enters the house as a cook, things begin to change as he imparts morals and values in each of them, which clears the smokescreen of misunderstandings that separate the relatives. Meanwhile, a lookout notice is given for a criminal who has escaped from prison and is skilled in stealing from houses after working as a servant, cook, music teacher, and dance teacher by gaining the trust of the respective family members. Although Raghu continues to impresses everyone with his vocabulary and multiple skills in dance, Sanskrit, and music, he secretly has eyes on the box of jewels and gold. Who is he and what are his intentions?

Cast

 Sudeep as Raghu (Cook)/Rajeev Somasagar 
 Anu Prabhakar as Neetha
 Deepa Bhaskar as Radha
 Master Hirannayya as Kailasanatha
 Srinivasa Murthy as Ramanath
 Ramesh Bhat as Kashinath
 Vaishali Kasaravalli as Seethadevi
 Chitra Shenoy as Shobha
 Komal as Vishwanath aka Gandharva
 Arun Sagar as Dance Guruji
 (Rohit)  as Chintu
 Deepu as Arun 
 Vishnuvardhan as Himself (guest role)
 Shiva Rajkumar as Himself (narrator artist)

Soundtrack

References

External links
 

Indian drama films
Films scored by Bharadwaj (composer)
Cooking films
Kannada remakes of Bengali films
2000s Kannada-language films